Recorded over the span of more than 18 months, Strictly Instrumental was the ninth rock and roll album by Bill Haley & His Comets, and their final album of new material for Decca Records (although Decca would release previously unissued recordings during the 1960s). Produced by Milt Gabler (the last full album he would produce for Haley), the album collects instrumental recordings made by Haley and the Comets between June 1958 and their final Decca recording sessions in September 1959. (The band subsequently began recording for Warner Bros. Records in January 1960.)

As the title of the album suggests, all of the songs on this album were instrumentals, with the exception of some ensemble singing on the track "Chiquita Linda". Bill Haley's involvement in the recordings was a matter of conjecture until research for the Bear Family Records box set The Decca Years and More in the early 1990s confirmed his presence. Recording session information compiled by music historian Chris Gardner reveals that three different bass guitar players are heard on the varying tracks: Al Rex, Al Pompilli and Al Rappa.

The album contains the Franny Beecher and Billy Williamson composition "The Catwalk", "Shaky", also composed by Franny Beecher and Billy Williamson, and "Two Shadows", composed by pianist Johnny Grande and Billy Williamson. 

The album contained two chart hits: "Joey's Song", which made the charts in 1959, reaching no.35 on Cashbox, no.46 on Billboard, no.26 on the Canadian charts, and which was no.1 for 8 weeks on the Australian charts (December 12, 1959 – January 30, 1960) based on the Kent Music Report, and "Skokiaan", which became one of the band's last new Decca North American charting recordings when it was released as a single in 1960. The Warner Brothers release "Tamiami" would reach no. 79 on Cashbox on March 12, 1960. "Joey's Song" was no.2 on the year-end Top 25 Singles of 1959 list in Australia based on the Kent Music Report. "Shaky", written by Franny Beecher and Billy Williamson, was also released as a single from the album by Decca in 1959. This album also featured Haley's last recordings to be produced by Milt Gabler, with the exception of a single ("The Green Door"/"Yeah, She's Evil!") recorded for Decca in 1964.

Track listing

 "Joey's Song" (Joe Reisman)
 "Music! Music! Music!" (Bernie Baum, Stephen Weiss)
 "Mack the Knife" (Kurt Weill, Bertolt Brecht, Marc Blitzstein)
 "In a Little Spanish Town" (Mabel Wayne, Sam M. Lewis, Joe Young)
 "Two Shadows" (Johnny Grande, Billy Williamson)
 "Shaky" (Franny Beecher, Billy Williamson)
 "Strictly Instrumental" (Bennie Benjamin, Edgar Battle, Sol Marcus, Eddie Seiler)
 "Skokiaan" (Tom Glazer, August Msarurgwa)
 "Puerto Rican Peddler" (Johnny Brandon)
 "Drowsy Waters" (Jack Ailau)
 "Chiquita Linda" (Un Poquito de tu Amor) (Julio Gutierrez)
 "The Catwalk" (Franny Beecher, Billy Williamson)

Personnel
 Bill Haley – rhythm guitar
 Franny Beecher – lead guitar
 Billy Williamson – steel guitar
 Johnny Grande – piano
 Ralph Jones – drums
 Rudy Pompilli - tenor saxophone
 Al Rex – bass guitar on 1 11
 Al Pompilli - bass guitar on 6 12
 Al Rappa - bass guitar on all others

Singles

1959

Shaky/Caldonia (Decca 30926)
Joey's Song/Ooh! Look-a-There, Ain't She Pretty? (Decca 30956)

1960

Skokiaan (South African Song) /Puerto Rican Peddler (Decca 31030)
Music! Music! Music!/Strictly Instrumental (Decca 31080)

References

External links
 Bill Haley discography

1959 albums
Bill Haley & His Comets albums
Albums produced by Milt Gabler
Instrumental albums
Decca Records albums